Saint Vigilius of Trent (c. 353 – 26 June 405) is venerated as the patron saint and bishop of Trent. He should not be confused with the pope of the same name.

Life
According to tradition, he was a Roman patrician, the son of Maxentia and a man whose name is sometimes given as Theodosius. His brothers, Claudian and Magorian, are also venerated as saints. Vigilius was educated at Athens and seems to have been a friend of Saint John Chrysostom. 

In 380, Vigilius settled in the city of  Trent and was chosen as the city's bishop. He may have been consecrated by either Ambrose of Milan or Valerian (Valerianus) of Aquileia. Ambrose donated the episcopal insignia and showed a paternal solicitude for Vigilius. As bishop, Vigilius attempted to convert Arians and pagans to Nicene Christianity and is said to have founded thirty parishes in his diocese. He is traditionally regarded as the founder of the  Church of Santa Maria Maggiore, Trent. A letter attributed to Ambrose encourages Vigilius to oppose marriages between Christians and pagans. Vigilius also preached in Brescia and Verona, which lay outside of his diocese.

His companions during his missions were Saints Sisinnius, Martyrius and Alexander, who were sent by Ambrose to assist Vigilius.  Tradition makes these three natives of Cappadocia. A work called De Martyrio SS. Sisinnii, Martyrii et Alexandri is attributed to Vigilius.

In 397, Sisinnius, Martyrius and Alexander (Sisinio, Martirio e Alessandro) were killed at Sanzeno after they attempted to convert the local population there to Christianity. Vigilius forgave their killers and had the remains of the three men sent to John Chrysostom in Constantinople, as well as to Simplician, Ambrose's successor, in Milan.

Vigilius is associated with the legend of St. Romedius, who is often depicted alongside or astride a bear. According to Romedius' hagiography, Romedius once wished to visit Vigilius, a friend of his youth, but Romedius' horse was torn to pieces by a wild bear. Romedius, however, had the bear bridled by his disciple David (Davide). The bear became docile and carried Romedius on its back to Trento.

Death

According to a much later tradition, Vigilius, who had been accompanied by his brothers Claudian and Magorian as well as a priest named Julian, was killed in the present-day parish of Rendena, in the Rendena Valley, where he had been preaching to the locals there, who worshipped the god Saturn. Vigilius said Mass and overturned a statue of the god into the Sarca River. As punishment, he was stoned to death near Lake Garda at the area called Punta San Vigilio.

Ironically, a statue of the god Neptune stands in front of Vigilius' shrine in Trent today.

Veneration

Vigilius was buried at a church that he built at Trent, later expanded by his successor Eugippius, and dedicated to Vigilius. This became Trento Cathedral. He was immediately venerated after his death, and the acts of his life and death were sent to Rome, and Pope Innocent I, according to the Catholic Encyclopedia, "seems to have made a formal canonization, for Benedict XIV calls Vigilius the first martyr canonized by a pope.”

Vigilius’ arm was removed as a separate relic and placed into its own reliquary in 1386.  He is venerated in Tyrol.  A German farmers’ saying associated with a 2nd feast day of 31 January was: "Friert es zu Vigilius / im März die Eiseskälte kommen muss!" (“If it freezes on St. Vigilius’ Day, frost will come in March!”).  There are similar sayings associated with other “weather saints.”

See also
 Maximus of Turin

References 

Nicholas Everett, Patron Saints of Early Medieval Italy AD c.350-800 (PIMS/Durham University Press, 2016), pp.124-138.

External links
  ökumenisches Heiligenlexikon, Vigilius_von_Trient
 Vigilius
  J.Leinweber, Heiligsprechungen bis 1234

Bishops in Trentino-Alto Adige/Südtirol
350s births
405 deaths
5th-century Christian saints
4th-century Italian bishops
5th-century Christian martyrs
4th-century Italian writers
5th-century Italian writers